The 2021 South Central Asian Gymnastics Championships was an artistic gymnastics competition held in Dhaka, Bangladesh. The event was held between 27 and 31 October.

Medalists

Participating nations

References 

South Central Asia
South Central Asia